The Between (1995) is the first novel by writer Tananarive Due. It was nominated for the
1996 Bram Stoker Award.

Plot

A middle-class African American couple's life is shattered when the wife begins receiving death threats. The husband begins to experience an alternative reality so real he has trouble grasping which is real. His psychiatrist diagnosis him as a latent schizophrenic. The family must decide if its schizophrenia, are the dreams a cosmic death threat or has the husband become unstuck from this reality and become stuck between worlds.

Reviews
Part horror novel, part detective story and part speculative fiction, The Between is a mix of genres. Yet it is no hybrid. It is a finely honed work that always engages and frequently surprises. -- JAMES POLK, The New York Times

Development of novel 
The lengthy autobiographical essay by Due elucidates the history and context of her first novel The Between among many other works and details of her life. Due also subtly suggests the horrifying thought that pervades the story but is left tactfully unspoken: if each of us creates our own reality, then ultimately we are all alone in the world.

References

1995 American novels
American horror novels
Novels by Tananarive Due
HarperCollins books
African-American novels